{{Infobox given name
| name            = Orelia
| gender          = Female
| masculine       = 
| language        = 
| languageorigin  = Latin
| origin          = Aurelia or Oralia
| meaning         = "Golden" or "Estate of Aurelius"
| related names   = Orelious, Orellana, Orellana, Orellia, Ortelius, Orelias, Oralia, Orelus, Orelas, Ornellas
}}

Orelia ( or its variants Orelious, Ornellas, Orellana, Orellia, Ortelius or Orelias) is a feminine name primarily occurring in Europe, Mediterranean and South America. Deriving from the Latin, Aurelius family meaning "golden". Although not exceedingly common in America the name Orelia has been present since the 1800s. On the contrarily the last name "Orelias" and its various spellings, however are not common and have decreased or virtually gone non extant since the mid-1800s. The name has been documented in Spain, Haiti, Brazil, America, and South Africa. The name "Orellana" is a habitational name from either of two places in Badajoz province, probably so called from Latin villa Aureliana meaning ‘estate of Aurelius’. There are many variations of the name spelling as well. 

People with this given name

 First and Middle name 

 Orelia Key Bell (April 8, 1864 – June 2, 1959), American poet.
 Orelia E. Merchant, an assistant U.S. Attorney and wife of Karim Camara.
 Orelia C. LaBostrie, mother of American songwriter, Dorothy LaBostrie best known for co-writing Little Richard's 1955 hit "Tutti Frutti".
 Princess Orelia Benskina (1911–2002), Panamanian American Latin jazz performer, and author.

 Last Name 

 Abraham Ortelius, (4 or 14 April 1527 – 28 June 1598), a Brabantian cartographer, geographer, and cosmographer, conventionally recognized as the creator of the first modern atlas.
Marcus Ornellas, a Brazilian actor. 
 Marcus Orelias, recording artist, game designer, content creator, graphic designer, songwriter, entrepreneur and actor.

Locations

 Orelia, Western Australia.
 Orelia Frio, Texas, United States.

Schools

 Orelia Primary School, a school located in the city of Perth, Western Australia.

Songs

 "Orélia", a 2002 song by singer Otto.

Plants

 Allamanda cathartica, a flower native to Brazil also referred to as Orelia grandiflora''.

Military vessels

 MV Ortelius, an ice-strengthened vessel currently employed for expedition-style polar cruises.

Insects

 Orellia, a genus of tephritid or fruit flies.
 Orellia falcata 
 Orellia scorzonerae 
 Orellia stictica 
 Orellia tragopogonis

In Pop Culture

 Orelia is character introduced into the video game Fortnite.

References

Names
Feminine given names